Iceberg Sofia is an ice hockey team in Sofia, Bulgaria.

History
The club was founded in 2001. They made their first appearance in the Bulgarian Cup during the 2001-02 season, before joining the Bulgarian Hockey League for the 2002-03 season. They returned to the BHL as Iceberg-Sulis Sofia for the 2003-04 season. The club returned to action for the 2006-07 season, playing in the Bulgarian Amateur Hockey League. Iceberg participated in the Balkan League during the 2008-09 season, before joining the Bulgarian Hockey League for the 2009-10 season. Currently, Iceberg only consists of junior teams.

External links
Club profile on eurohockey.com

2001 establishments in Bulgaria
Bulgarian Hockey League teams
Ice hockey clubs established in 2001
Ice hockey teams in Bulgaria
Sport in Sofia